James Ervin may refer to:

James Ervin (politician) (1778–1841), U.S. Representative from South Carolina
Sam J. Ervin IV (born 1955), also known as Jimmy Ervin, American lawyer and jurist
Jim Ervin (footballer), Irish footballer in 2007 Setanta Sports Cup Final

See also
James Irvine (disambiguation)